Love That Music is the 2009 debut album by the South African recording artist Timothy Moloi.

Recording
First released by Thatch Music on 1 July 2009, Love That Music, was recorded at Undahaus Studios in Johannesburg, South Africa.

In 2010 the album was nominated for two South African Music Awards, namely Best Producer (James Bassingthwaighte and Jaydine Baron) and Best Engineer (Robin Walsh).

Reception
 The Star: "probably the most feel good album of the year" - Therese Owen, The Star Tonight 
 The Herald: "one of the most exciting new vocal talents to hit the scene in recent years" - Leon Muston, CD Scene 
 Daily Sun: "This is talent at its best... the velvet-voiced youngster is going places with this debut solo album" - Mathews Mpete
 City Press: "Love That Music is something different, well mixed and has a vintage feel to it" - Luyanda Longwe, City Pulse

Track listing
"Love That Music" – 00:38
"Friday Morning" – 04:37
"Don't Tell Me It's Over" – 03:47
"Don't You Worry About A Thing" – 03:49
"Give Me Your Love" – 03:29
"Keeps Getting Better" – 03:52
"Close Your Eyes" – 03:57
"Won't Turn Back" – 04:57
"Feel Me Smile" – 03:42
"Burn Out" (Thatch Remix)" – 04:18
"Come To Me" – 03:10
"Memories" – 04:29
"Pretty Necklace" (Hidden Track) – 02:15

Production
Produced by James Bassingthwaighte
Co-produced by Jaydine Baron and Michael Bester for Thatch Music
Mixed by Robin Walsh at Undahaus Studios, Johannesburg
Engineered by Robin Walsh at Undahaus Studios, Johannesburg
Mastered by Geoff Pesche at Abbey Road Studios, London

References

2009 albums